The economy of Uruguay features an export-oriented agricultural sector and a well-educated workforce, along with high levels of social spending.  Tourism and banking are also important sectors; Uruguay acts as a regional hub for international finance and tourism. The country also has a history and representation of advanced workers-rights protection, with unions and the eight-hour work-day protected at the beginning of the 20th century.  

Though 90% of the country's population is urbanized, most of the industry and over half of the population is concentrated in the capital Montevideo. 

After averaging growth of 5% annually during 1996–98, Uruguay's economy suffered a major downturn in 1999–2002, stemming largely from the spillover effects of the  economic problems of its large neighbors, Argentina and Brazil. In 2001–02, Argentine citizens made massive withdrawals of dollars deposited in Uruguayan banks after bank deposits in Argentina were frozen, which led to a plunge in the Uruguayan peso, causing the 2002 Uruguay banking crisis.

History

19th century 
In the 19th century, the country had similar characteristics to other Latin American countries: caudillismo, civil wars and permanent instability (40 revolts between 1830 and 1903), foreign capitalism's control of important sectors of the economy, a high percentage of illiterate people (more than half the population in 1900). Among foreign investments, investors from Great Britain controlled 22% of the land and many majors parts of the industrial infrastructure, including meatpacking and leather industry, infrastructure for water and gas, and transport systems like trolley and 1100 miles of rail.

Reforms after Batlle 
José Batlle y Ordóñez, President from 1903 to 1907 and again from 1911 to 1915, set the pattern for Uruguay's modern political development and dominated the political scene until he died in 1929. Batlle introduced widespread political, social, and economic reforms such as a welfare program, government participation in many facets of the economy, and a new constitution.  

Batlle nationalized foreign-owned companies and created a modern social welfare system. Income tax for lower incomes was abolished in 1905, secondary schools established in every city (1906), telephone network nationalized, unemployment benefits were introduced (1914), eight-hour working day introduced (1915), etc. By 1929, 84% of manufacturing was concentrated in a handful of industries: meatpacking, leather and wool. Industrial policies further encouraging migration from rural to urban communities, as well as waves of immigrants from southern and eastern Europe. Investment in urban infrastructure in Montevideo and a growing economy, was capped by hosting the first 1930 FIFA World Cup.

Claudio Williman who served between Batlle's two terms was his supporter and continued all his reforms, as did the next President Baltasar Brum (1919–1923). Around 1900 infant mortality rates (IMR) in Uruguay were among the world's lowest, indicating a very healthy population.

Mid-20th century 
The economy of Uruguay started in the early 20th century (1920s-1950s) with government policy focused on import substitution industrialization, where the government encouraged and protected national manufacturers to reduce dependency on imports. Generally, manufacturing prospered during this period with growth of 8.4% a year from 1945 to 1954. 

By 1956 the middle class was approximately 40% of the population, with urban services and culture, like mass media and cinema, flourishing. However, the policy of import substitution industrialization began to collapse in the 1950s, leading to economic and social unrest.  Many economic histories describe both the 50s and 60s and dictatorship period (70s and 80s) as economic downturn periods, followed by further economic degradation caused by neoliberalism. 

The policies of the Colorado Party under Julio María Sanguinetti and Jorge Batlle during the 90s and early 2000s, following global trends of neo-liberalization, facilitated a shift from manufacturing and small-scale agriculture, towards increasing monoculture agriculture and services like finance and tourism. However, these policies faded as the regional economic problems in Argentina and Brazil caused a downturn and unemployment from 1998 to 2003. The economic and social crises that followed allowed for the election of the Broad Front a leftist coalition against the neoliberal policies.

Contemporary trends 
The number of trade unionists has quadrupled since 2003, from 110,000 to more than 400,000 in 2015 for a working population of 1.5 million people. According to the International Trade Union Confederation, Uruguay has become the most advanced country in the Americas in terms of respect for "fundamental labor rights, in particular, freedom of association, the right to collective bargaining and the right to strike".

Currency
Uruguay has a partially dollarized economy.  almost 60% of bank loans use United States dollars, but most transactions use the Uruguayan peso. Today, the Uruguayan peso is minted in coins of 1, 2, 5, 10, and 50 pesos and in  banknotes of 20, 50, 100, 200, 500, 1000, and 2000 pesos.

Sectors

Agriculture, textiles and leather

Throughout Uruguay's history, their strongest exporting industries have been beef and wool. In the case of beef exports, they have been boosted since Uruguay joined the Mercosur agreement in 1991 and the country has been able trade with more distant markets, such as Japan. In 2018, it produced 589 thousand tons of beef. In the case of wool exports, they have not been doing so well in recent years suffering from other competitors in the market like New Zealand and the fluctuations of its demand during the 2008 recession in the developed world.

As timber refining is being kept within the country, forestry has become a growth industry in recent years. In 2018, the country produced 1.36 million tons of rice, 1.33 million tons of soy, 816 thousand tons of maize, 637 thousand tons of barley, 440 thousand tons of wheat, 350 thousand tons of sugar cane, 106 thousand tons of orange, 104 thousand tons of grape, 90 thousand tons of rapeseed, 87 thousand tons of potato, 76 thousand tons of sorghum, 71 thousand tons of tangerine, 52 thousand tons of oats, 48 thousand tons of apple, in addition to smaller yields of other agricultural products.

Liebig Extract of Meat Company ran a very large and influential beef extract factory in Fray Bentos for 100 years.

Energy

Software

During the last decades the software industry has developed considerably. Many start-ups have been very successful, such is the case of PedidosYa. Uruguay also exports software; the similar geographic longitude to that of the United States makes it attractive for companies to outsource software development to Uruguayan companies. Other notable Uruguayan software enterprises are: Genexus, Códigos del Sur, Overactive.

Mining

Although this is a sector that does not make substantial contributions to the country's economy, in recent years there has been some activity in gold and cement production, and also in the extraction of granite.

Artigas Department is well known for its amethyst and agate quartz varieties mining. During 2010s 20 thousand tons of minerals were extracted with a value of 9 million of US dollars, exported to Germany, United States, Brazil and China.

Plastics

Due to two major investments made in 1991 and 1997, the most significant manufactured exports in Uruguay are plastics. These investments laid the way for most of the substantial exports of plastic-based products which have taken a very important role in Uruguay's economy.

Telecommunications

Despite having poor levels of investment in the fixed-line sector, the small size of Uruguay's population has enabled them to attain one of the highest telecommunication density levels in South America and reach a 100% digitalization of main lines. Although the telecommunications sector has been under a state monopoly for some years, provisions have been made to introduce liberalization and to allow for the entry of more firms into the cellular sector.

Travel and tourism

In 2013, travel and tourism accounted for 9.4% of the country's GDP. Their tourist industry is mainly characterized for attracting visitors from neighboring countries. Currently Uruguay's major attraction is the interior, particularly located in the region around Punta del Este.

Specialties of Uruguay

 Cattle were introduced to Uruguay before its independence by Hernando Arias de Saavedra, the Spanish Governor of Buenos Aires in 1603. Beef exports in 2006 amounted to around 37% of Uruguayan exports.
 Wool is a traditional product exported mainly to America, followed by the UK and India.
 Milk and dairy products. Conaprole, National Cooperative of Milk Producers is the main exporter of dairy products in Latin America (in 2006). The area of the country dedicated to dairy food is located mainly in the southwest.
 Rice. Fine varieties are produced in the lowlands in the east of the country close to Merin lake on the Uruguay-Brazil border. The national company Saman claims to be the main exporter in Latin America. Countries it exports to include Brazil, Iran, Peru, South Africa, Chile, Senegal, Argentina, Paraguay, Bolivia, Ecuador, USA, Canada and China.
 Tourism: Several seaside resorts, like Punta del Este or Punta del Diablo in the south-eastern departments of Maldonado and Rocha, regarded as a jet-set resort in South America, are main attractions of Uruguay. International cruises call at Montevideo from October to March every year. Also, Uruguay hosts many year-round international conferences. (The original GATT Uruguay Round concerning trade was, as its name suggests, hosted in Uruguay). Montevideo is home to the headquarters (secretariat) of [Mercosur], the Common Market of the South, whose full members are Uruguay, Argentina, Brazil, Paraguay and Venezuela, associate members Bolivia, Chile, Colombia, Ecuador and Peru.
 Software and consulting. Uruguay's well-educated workforce and lower-than-international wages have put Uruguay on the IT map. A product named GeneXus, originally created in Uruguay by a company called ArTech, is noteworthy. Other important developers and consultants include De Larrobla & Asociados, Greycon and Quanam. Tata Consultancy Services has its headquarters for the Spanish speaking world in Uruguay.

"With a population of only three million, Uruguay has rapidly become Latin America's outsourcing hub. In partnership with one of India's largest technology consulting firms, engineers in Montevideo work while their counterparts in Mumbai sleep." - The New York Times, Sep 22, 2006.

 Banking Services. Banking has traditionally been one of the strongest service export sectors in the country. Uruguay was once dubbed "the Switzerland of America", mainly for its banking sector and stability. The largest bank in Uruguay is Banco República, or BROU, which is state-owned; another important state bank is the BHU. Almost 20 private banks, most of the branches of international banks, operate in the country (Banco Santander, ABN AMRO, Citibank, among others). There is also a myriad of brokers and financial-services bureaus, among them Ficus Capital, Galvin Sociedad de Bolsa, Europa Sociedad de Bolsa, Darío Cukier, GBU, Hordeñana & Asociados Sociedad de Bolsa, etc. Uruguay has fully recovered from the financial crisis that caused a run on its banks.
 Public Sector: The state in Uruguay has an important role in the economy, Uruguay resisted the trend of privatization in Utilities and state-owned enterprises in the region. Several Referendums supported the state being in control of the most important utilities and energy companies. Some of the companies have a full monopoly warranted by law (like landline telephony, water), others compete freely with private operators (Insurance, mobile telephony, Banks). Most of them are dominant in the local market. There is strong debate in the Uruguayan society about their role and future. Some of them contributed to the Uruguay state treasury.
The most important state-owned companies are: Republica AFAP (Pension Fund), AFE (Railways), ANCAP (Energy), ANCO (Mail), Administracion Nacional de Puertos (Ports), ANTEL (Telecommunications: Telephony, Mobiles (ANCEL and Data ANTELDATA)), BHU (Mortgage Bank), BROU (Bank), BSE (Insurance), OSE (Water & Sewage), UTE  (Electricity). These companies operate under public law, using a legal entity defined in the Uruguayan Constitution called 'Ente Autonomo' (Meaning Autonomic Entity). The government also owns parts of other companies operating under private law like the National Airline Carrier PLUNA and others owned totally or partially by the CND National Development Corporation.

Trade agreements

Data

The following table shows the main economic indicators in 1980–2021 (with IMF staff estimates in 2022–2027). Inflation below 10% is in green.

Industrial production growth rate: 12.6% (2006 est.)
Electricity - production: 9,474 GWh (1998)
fossil fuel: 3.91%
hydro: 95.62%
nuclear: 0%
other: 0.47% (1998)
Electricity - consumption: 6,526 GWh (1998)
Electricity - exports: 2,363 GWh (1998)
Electricity - imports: 78 GWh (1998)
Agriculture - products: wheat, rice, barley, maize, sorghum; livestock; fish
Exchange rates: Uruguayan pesos per US dollar - 24.048 (2006), 24.479 (2005), 28.704 (2004), 28.209 (2003), 21.257 (2002)

Uruguay in the world

The following table shows the economic rankings of Uruguay compared to the world:

See also
 Petroleum in Uruguay
 Taxation in Uruguay
 Economy of South America
 List of Latin American and Caribbean countries by GDP growth
 List of Latin American and Caribbean countries by GDP (nominal)
 List of Latin American and Caribbean countries by GDP (PPP)
 IMF-Uruguayan Relationship

Notes

References

External links
World Bank Summary Trade Statistics Uruguay

 
Uruguay